Maja Petrić is a contemporary new media artist who works primarily in interactive art that combines light, sound and cutting-edge technologies such as artificial intelligence, computer vision, and robotics to expand the multi-sensory apparatus through which art can be experience. She was born in 1981 in Zagreb, Croatia. She lives and works in Madrid, Seattle, New York City, and Zagreb. She received a PhD in new media art from the University of Washington Center for Digital Arts and Experimental Media  and Masters from the New York University's Tisch School of the Arts, Interactive Telecommunications Program (ITP).

Maja has conceived and produced interactive art environments for Microsoft, interactive experiences for Hong Kong Landmark, permanent light installations for Google, etc. Her commissions include tour of the immersive installation We Are All Made Of Light across the US, and series of interactive installations that take place in public parks, commercial, and private venues.

Maja is the recipient of The Lumen Prize for Art and Technology for Interactive Art, Microsoft Research Residency Award, Richard Kelly Light Art Award, Doctoral Fellowship from National Science Foundation, and was nominated for International Light Art Award, Arts Innovator Award, and FastCo. Innovation by Design Awards.

She has been teaching about light and art at the University of Washington, Complutense University of Madrid, Technical University of Madrid, and European Institute of Design. In 2016 she designed and directed the first-of-its-kind graduate program “Creative Lighting” at European Institute of Design in Madrid, Spain.

Notable Works
We Are All Made of Light (2018-19) 
Lost Skies (2017-19)  
I Saw My Birth, Love, and Death in the Sky (2017) A Panorama of The Skies (2013) 
The Skies Epitomized (2013) 
Horizon is an Imaginary Line (2013)
Skies (2013) 

Her work Skies Epitomized of War and Peace was featured by City Arts Magazine in a collection of creative writings and art, along with works from artists like Ari Glass, Gabriel Teodros and others.

References

External links

1981 births
Living people